Dominion 6.18 was a professional wrestling pay-per-view (PPV) event promoted by New Japan Pro-Wrestling (NJPW). The event took place on June 18, 2011, in Osaka, Osaka, at the Osaka Prefectural Gymnasium. The event featured ten matches, five of which were contested for championships. It was the third event under the Dominion name.

Storylines
Dominion 6.18 featured ten professional wrestling matches that involved different wrestlers from pre-existing scripted feuds and storylines. Wrestlers portrayed villains, heroes, or less distinguishable characters in the scripted events that built tension and culminated in a wrestling match or series of matches.

Event
The event featured a tag team match, where NJPW's IWGP Tag Team Champions, Bad Intentions (Giant Bernard and Karl Anderson), defeated Pro Wrestling Noah's GHC Tag Team Champions, Takuma Sano and Yoshihiro Takayama, to become double champions. The event also featured the surprise debut of former WWE wrestler Brian Kendrick, who replaced Killer Rabbit as Gedo and Jado's partner. During the event, Consejo Mundial de Lucha Libre (CMLL) wrestler Máscara Dorada regained the CMLL World Middleweight Championship from Ryusuke Taguchi to whom he had lost it at Fantastica Mania 2011 the previous January, while DDT Pro-Wrestling wrestler and winner of the 2011 Best of the Super Juniors Kota Ibushi captured the IWGP Junior Heavyweight Championship from Prince Devitt. In the main event, Hiroshi Tanahashi successfully defended the IWGP Heavyweight Championship against Hirooki Goto.

Aftermath
A post-main event confrontation between Tanahashi and new double tag team champion Giant Bernard led to two title matches; Tanahashi and Goto challenging Bad Intentions for the IWGP Tag Team Championship and Bernard challenging Tanahashi for the IWGP Heavyweight Championship. Both champions ended up retaining their titles.

Results

References

External links
The official New Japan Pro-Wrestling website

2011
2011 in professional wrestling
June 2011 events in Japan
Professional wrestling in Osaka
Events in Osaka